Thomas Cockcroft (15 January 1916 – 19 September 1994) was a professional rugby league footballer.

Personal life
Cockcroft was born in the family home 6 May Street, Lawkholme in Keighley and attended Eastwood Primary School. Tom married Eileen Scott on 5 November 1938 at Ingrow Church. They had two children, Mollie born 8 June 1936 and future rugby player William born 12 May 1946. A keen sportsman, Tommy played local association football for Sutton United and Ingrow United and he had trials for both Burnley F.C. and Accrington Stanley F.C. before starting his rugby career with Keighley RLFC.

Keighley RLFC
Cockroft made his début for Keighley on 12 February 1938 in the away fixture to Newcastle and marked the occasion by scoring an injury-time try to level the scores in the 6-all drawn game. He later formed a formidable partnership with Welsh rugby union convert Ken Davies who played at Stand-off half.

Military service 
Like many sportsmen of this era Cockroft's best years were lost due to military service in World War II. During the war Cockcroft served in the Royal Artillery as a Lance Bombardier service number 1674971.

He was an Anti Aircraft Gunner in the 9th AA Division from 1940 until he was demobbed in 1945. During his service he helped to defend London and Cardiff. He was wounded in action at Clifton Suspension Bridge during a Luftwaffe attack on the Bristol Aeroplane Company factory at Filton on the night of 25 September 1940, in which 168 bombs were dropped in 45 seconds, killing 131 people. Later in 1944 he helped defend London again during the Flying bomb offensive, Operation Diver; this time from East Anglia, which became known locally as 'Bomb Alley'.

The 9th AA Division had some very good rugby union and rugby league players. During the war rugby league players were able to play rugby union. Cockroft played in the winning team in April 1942 at the divisional rugby union final which was played at the home of the Welsh Rugby Union, the Millennium Stadium, in Cardiff.

Service to Keighley RLFC
Following Cockroft's retirement from playing, he and his wife Eileen ran the public bar at Keighley RLFC's Lawkholme Lane premises for 16 years as Steward and Stewardess respectively.

Genealogical information 

Cockcroft is the father of the former Keighley RLFC  William Cockcroft.

He was father-in-law of the former Rugby Union prop for North Eastern Counties, Yorkshire and Bradford RFC, Frank Whitcombe Jr

He was grandfather to the Rugby Union prop for England 'B' and Leicester Tigers, Martin Whitcombe and the great-grandfather rugby union prop for England (Under-20s) and Leicester Tigers (2019/20 Development Squad); James William Whitcombe (born ).

References

100 Years of Lawkholme Lane by Trevor Delaney & John Pitchforth
Lawkholme Lane Galleries by Trevor Delaney & John Pitchforth
Whitcombe family archive
"The Anti-Aircraft Defence Of The United Kingdom From 28th July, 1939, To 15th April, 1945" London Gazette

External links

1916 births
1994 deaths
British Army personnel of World War II
English rugby league players
Keighley Cougars players
Royal Artillery soldiers
Rugby league centres
Rugby league players from Keighley
Rugby league wingers